Ulka may refer to:

 Ulka Gupta (born 1997), Indian film and television actress 
 Ulka Sasaki (born 1989), Japanese mixed martial artist
 DRDO Ulka, Indian air-launched expendable target drone
 BNS Ulka, establishment of the Bangladeshi Navy
 Ulka (novel), Bengali novel by Nihar Ranjan Gupta published in 1959
 Krasnaya Ulka, administrative center of Krasnoulskoye Rural Settlementin Russia